Starlink is a satellite internet constellation operated by SpaceX providing satellite Internet access to most of the Earth. Starshield is a derivative of starlink designed to be operated and can host payloads for military or government purposes.

Launches

Starlink Launches 
The deployment of the first 1,440 satellites will be into 72 orbital planes of 20 satellites each, with a requested lower minimum elevation angle of beams to improve reception: 25° rather than the 40° of the other two orbital shells. SpaceX launched the first 60 satellites of the constellation in May 2019 into a  orbit and expected up to six launches in 2019 at that time, with 720 satellites (12 × 60) for continuous coverage in 2020.

In August 2019, SpaceX expected four more launches in 2019 and at least nine launches in 2020, but since January 2020 expectations had increased to 24 total launches in 2020.

In March 2020, SpaceX reported producing six satellites per day.

Starlink satellites are also planned to launch on Starship, an under-development rocket of SpaceX with a much larger payload capacity.

In February 2021, Musk stated that the satellites are traveling on 25 orbital planes clustered between 53° north and south of the equator.

Totals

:
 Satellites launched: 4105
 Satellites failed or deorbited:  349
 Satellites in orbit: 3803
 Satellites working: 3756
 Satellites operational: 3235

Starshield

See also 

 List of Falcon 9 and Falcon Heavy launches
 List of Falcon 9 first-stage boosters

Notes

References 

Communications satellite constellations
Communications satellites of the United States
Satellite Internet access
SpaceX satellites